Danielle Orchard (born December 2, 1985) is a painter living and working in Brooklyn, New York.

Biography
Orchard grew up in Fort Wayne, Indiana. She received her Bachelor of Fine Arts from Indiana University in 2009 and studied in Florence, Italy. She earned an MFA from CUNY Hunter College in 2013. She is a former member of Underdonk gallery collective in the Bushwick Neighborhood of Brooklyn. Orchard is represented by Jack Hanley Gallery in New York, NY.

Education
 2009: Bachelor of Fine Arts, Indiana University 
 2013: Master of Fine Arts, Hunter College

Awards 
 The Dedalus Foundation, MFA Fellowship Recipient, 2013.
 Alma B.C. Schapiro Artist in Residence, The Corporation of Yaddo, 2015

Publications 
 "Contemporary Female Artists to Be Obsessed With", SHK Magazine, August 24, 2014.

References

External links 
 

1985 births
American women artists
Living people
21st-century American women